Kernersville Township is one of fifteen townships in Forsyth County, North Carolina, United States. The township had a population of 30,386 according to the 2010 census.

Geography 
Geographically, Kernersville Township occupies  in eastern Forsyth County.  Much of Kernersville Township consists of the town of Kernersville and a small portion of the town of Walkertown.

References

Townships in Forsyth County, North Carolina
Townships in North Carolina